Alex Newman (24 March 1909 – 2 June 1992) was a New Zealand cricketer. He played in two first-class matches for Wellington in 1930/31.

See also
 List of Wellington representative cricketers

References

External links
 

1909 births
1992 deaths
New Zealand cricketers
Wellington cricketers
Cricketers from Nelson, New Zealand